Bird of paradise may refer to:

 Bird-of-paradise, a family of birds of the family Paradisaeidae

Plants 
 Strelitzia, bird of paradise flower or plant, a genus of perennial plants
 Erythrostemon gilliesii, or bird of paradise, a shrub
 Caesalpinia pulcherrima, or Mexican bird of paradise, a shrub

Arts and entertainment

Literature
 The Bird of Paradise (play), a 1912 play by Richard Walton Tully
 The Birds of Paradise, a 1962 novel by Paul Scott

Film and television 
 Bird of Paradise (1932 film), based on Tully's play
 Bird of Paradise (1951 film), a colour film, based on Tully's play
 Birds of Paradise (2008 film), a Ukrainian film
 Birds of Paradise (2010 film), an Argentine-American computer-animated film
 Birds of Paradise (2021 film), an American film
 "Bird of Paradise", an episode of Godzilla, 1998
 "Birds of Paradise", an episode of Natural World, 2010
 "Birds of Paradise", an episode of Twice in a Lifetime, 2000
 "Bird of Paradise", an episode of Xiaolin Showdown, 2005

Music 
 Birds of Paradise (musical), a 1987 Off-Broadway musical 
 "Bird of Paradise" (Snowy White song), 1983
 "Bird of Paradise", a song by the Appleseed Cast from the 2001 album Low Level Owl, Vol. 1
 "Bird of Paradise", a song by Charlie Parker
 "Birds of Paradise", a song by Peter, Sue and Marc

Other uses 
 Bird of Paradise (aircraft), a 1927 American military airplane 
 Bird of Paradise Island, or Little Tobago, part of Trinidad and Tobago, named for the imported Paradisaea apoda

See also 

 Apus, a small constellation in the southern sky representing a bird of paradise
 The Byrds of Paradise, a television series
 Heliconia, or false bird-of-paradise, a genus of flowering plants
 Huma bird, a mythological creature commonly depicted in Persian, Ottoman Turkish, and Urdu poetry
 "May the Bird of Paradise Fly up Your Nose", a 1965 song by Jimmy Dickens
 Paradise Bird, a 1979 album by Amii Stewart